The 1982 Winfield Australian Masters was a professional non-ranking snooker tournament that took place between 7 and 9 July 1982 in the Channel 10 Television Studios in Sydney, Australia. The tournament was sponsored by Winfield and had a total prize fund of $100,000. There were two qualifying groups, played on a round-robin basis, with the top two players from each group progressing to the knockout stage. The semi-finals and final were decided on aggregated points scored: over two frames in the semi-finals, and over three frames in the final. The event was recorded for broadcast on Channel 10, with transmissions starting from 30 August 1982.

Steve Davis won the tournament by defeating Eddie Charlton 254–100 in the final. Davis also made the highest break, 86, in his match against Cliff Thorburn.

Results

Group A (one frame)

Group B (one frame)

Knockout

References

Australian Goldfields Open
1982 in Australian sport
1982 in snooker